Oreta griseotincta is a moth in the family Drepanidae. It was described by George Hampson in 1893. It is found in China (Hainan, Hong Kong, Yunnan), Taiwan, north-eastern India, Sikkim, Malaysia and Singapore.

The wingspan is about 32 mm. The wings are chestnut brown, the forewings slightly irrorated (sprinkled) with silvery grey. The medial and postmedial dark lines are angled below the costa and approach each other towards the inner margin. There is a blackish patch on the costa before the apex and three submarginal specks towards the inner margin. The hindwings are chestnut brown, slightly irrorated with silvery grey and indistinct curved ante- and postmedial lines.

Subspecies
Oreta griseotincta griseotincta (China, Taiwan, north-eastern India, Sikkim)
Oreta griseotincta acutior Watson, 1961 (Malaysia, Singapore)

References

Moths described in 1893
Drepaninae